Wiota is an unincorporated community and census-designated place (CDP) in the town of Wiota, Lafayette County, Wisconsin, United States. Its population was estimated to be 97 in 2017.

Geography
Wiota is in eastern Lafayette County, in the west-central part of the town of Wiota. The community sits on a ridge at the headwaters of Feather Branch, a south-flowing tributary of the Pecatonica River.

References

Unincorporated communities in Lafayette County, Wisconsin
Unincorporated communities in Wisconsin
Census-designated places in Lafayette County, Wisconsin
Census-designated places in Wisconsin